Ebenezer Creek is a tributary of the Savannah River in Effingham County, Georgia, about 20 miles north of the city of Savannah. During the American Civil War, an incident at the creek resulted in the drowning of many freed slaves.

Background
Throughout Sherman's March to the Sea, thousands of people escaping slavery attached themselves to the Union army's various infantry columns. Most eventually turned back, but those that remained were looked on as "a growing encumbrance" as the army approached Savannah in December 1864. Complicating the situation, Confederate cavalry under General Joseph Wheeler were actively harassing the Federal rear guard during this period.

Ebenezer Creek massacre
On December 8, 1864, the Union XIV Corps, under Brigadier General Jefferson C. Davis, reached the western bank of Ebenezer Creek. While Davis' engineers began assembling a pontoon bridge for the crossing, Wheeler's cavalry approached close enough to conduct sporadic shelling of the Union lines. By midnight the bridge was ready, and Davis's 14,000 men began their crossing. Over 600 freed people were anxious to cross with them, but Davis ordered his provost marshal to prevent this. The freedmen were told that they would be able to cross after a Confederate force in front had been dispersed. In reality, no such force existed. As the last Union soldiers reached the eastern bank on the morning of December 9, Davis's engineers abruptly cut the bridge loose and drew it up onto the shore.

On realizing their plight, a panic set in amongst the freedmen, who knew that Confederate cavalry were nearby. They "hesitated briefly, impacted by a surge of pressure from the rear, then stampeded with a rush into the icy water, old and young alike, men and women and children, swimmers and non-swimmers, determined not to be left behind." In the uncontrolled, terrified crush, many quickly drowned. On the eastern bank, some of Davis's soldiers made an effort to help those that they could reach, wading into the water as far as they dared. Others felled trees into the water. Several of the freedmen lashed logs together into a crude raft, which they used to rescue those they could and then to ferry others across the stream. 

While these efforts were under way, scouts from Wheeler's cavalry arrived, fired briefly at the soldiers on the far bank, and left to summon Wheeler's full force. Officers from the XIV Corps ordered their men to leave the scene, and the march was resumed. The freedmen continued their frantic efforts to ferry as many as possible across the stream on the makeshift raft, but when Wheeler's cavalry arrived in force, those refugees who had not made it to the eastern bank, or drowned in the attempt, were enslaved once more.

Aftermath

Davis's orders infuriated several of the Union men who witnessed the ensuing calamity, among them Major James A. Connolly and Chaplain John J. Hight. Connolly described the events in a letter to the Senate Military Commission, which found its way into the press. Secretary of War Edwin M. Stanton brought the incident up with Sherman and Davis during a visit to Savannah in January 1865. Davis defended his actions as a matter of military necessity, with Sherman's full support. 

In 2010, the Georgia Historical Society erected a historical marker titled "March to the Sea: Ebenezer Creek" near the site, recognizing the 1864 tragedy and its outcome.

Notes

References
 Foote, Shelby. The Civil War: A Narrative, volume 3, Red River to Appomattox. New York: Random House, 1974. 
 Miles, Jim. To The Sea, Revised Ed., Cumberland House Publishing, 2002. 
Sherman, William T., Memoirs of General W.T. Sherman, 2nd ed., D. Appleton & Co., 1913 (1889). Reprinted by the Library of America, 1990, .

External links
 Betrayal at Ebenezer Creek, Civil War Times
 Ebenezer Creek Historical Marker, erected 2010

Military history of the American Civil War
American Civil War sites
Georgia (U.S. state) in the American Civil War
African Americans in the American Civil War
History of Effingham County, Georgia
Tributaries of the Savannah River